The Coleco Telstar Arcade, commonly abbreviated as Telstar Arcade, is a first-generation home video game console that was released in 1977 in Japan, North America and Europe by Coleco. It is the most advanced video game console in the Coleco Telstar series, based on the MOS Technology MPS-7600-00x chips series. Each chip is a microcontroller capable of storing 512 words of ROM.

Construction and concept 

The Coleco Telstar Arcade is formed like a triangle. On every side are other game-specific controls. There is a side with a steering wheel and a lever, a side with a lightgun, and a side with two paddles. Depending on the game played, the player may use another side.

Games 
The games came on silver-colored cartridges, each containing a MOS Technology MPS-7600-00X chip. There were a total of 4 cartridges released for the system by Coleco. Every cartridge has a triangular shape which connects on the top of the console.

All games:

 Cartridge 1: Road Race (1 player), Tennis (Pong clone; 2-4 players) and Quickdraw (chip MPS 7600–002; 1-2 players)
 Cartridge 2: Hockey (2-4 players), Tennis (2-4 players), Handball (1-2 players) and Target (chip MPS 7600–001; 1 player)
 Cartridge 3: Bonus Pinball (1-2 players), Shooting Gallery (1 player), Shoot the Bear (1 player) and Deluxe Pinball (chip MPS 7600–004; 1-2 players)
 Cartridge 4: Naval Battle (1 player), Blast Away (1 player) and Speedball (chip MPS 7600–003; 1 player)

References 

Coleco consoles
First-generation video game consoles
Home video game consoles
Light guns
Pong variations
Products introduced in 1977
1970s toys
1977 in video gaming